The Glisan Building is an historic building in Portland, Oregon's Old Town Chinatown neighborhood, in the United States. The building was constructed in 1889, and houses Kells Irish Pub. It features Queen Anne Italianate style architecture and has been designated a City of Portland Historic Landmark.

References

1889 establishments in Oregon
Buildings and structures completed in 1889
Buildings and structures in Portland, Oregon
Old Town Chinatown
Southwest Portland, Oregon